Tylopilus alkalixanthus is a bolete fungus in the family Boletaceae. Found in Costa Rica and Japan, it was described as new to science in 2002 by Anja Amtoft and Roy Halling.

References

External links

alkalixanthus
Fungi described in 2002
Fungi of Asia
Fungi of Central America